Tb is a diesel-electric locomotive used by Banverket of Sweden, for line service and snowploughing. Ten locomotives were built for Swedish State Railways in 1969-70 by Nydquist & Holm (NOHAB), for combined freight and snowploughing service, along with 20 smaller Tc locomotives. When Banverket was demerged in 1988, the Tb was transferred to it.

External links
 Järnväg.net on Tb

NOHAB locomotives
Tb
Bo′Bo′ locomotives
Standard gauge locomotives of Sweden
Railway locomotives introduced in 1969